Borkowo  (German: Birkenfelde, East Prussia) is a village in the administrative district of Gmina Kolno, within Kolno County, Podlaskie Voivodeship, in north-eastern Poland.

The village has an approximate population of 715.

References

Borkowo